Yabous (Arabic: يابوس) is a Syrian village in the Qudsaya District of the Rif Dimashq Governorate. According to the Syria Central Bureau of Statistics (CBS), Yabous had a population of 369 in the 2004 census.

References

External links

Populated places in Qudsaya District